"The Life Inside" is the second episode of the second season of the American Neo-Western television series Justified. It is the 15th overall episode of the series and was written by story editor Benjamin Cavell and directed by Jon Avnet. It originally aired on FX on February 16, 2011.

The series is based on Elmore Leonard's stories about the character Raylan Givens, particularly "Fire in the Hole", which serves as the basis for the episode. The series follows Raylan Givens, a tough deputy U.S. Marshal enforcing his own brand of justice. Following the shooting of a mob hitman, Raylan is sent to Lexington, Kentucky to investigate an old childhood friend Boyd Crowder, who is now part of a white supremacist gang. In the episode, Raylan and Tim go to transfer a pregnant fugitive to give birth, but end up in the middle of a small-time human trafficking operation. Despite being credited, Erica Tazel does not appear in the episode.

According to Nielsen Media Research, the episode was seen by an estimated 2.41 million household viewers and gained a 0.9/3 ratings share among adults aged 18–49. The episode received positive reviews, although critics expressed disappointment at the short screen time for the Bennett family.

Plot
Dickie (Jeremy Davies) and Coover (Brad William Henke) dispose Walt's (Chris Mulkey) corpse in a mineshaft. Raylan (Timothy Olyphant) finds that Boyd (Walton Goggins) is now working in a mining site, having put his criminal life and desire to kill Bo's killer behind. Raylan then visits Arlo (Raymond J. Barry), who is now under house arrest, to ask him to return the $20,000 the Marshals gave him but Arlo claims he gave them to Bo.

Mags (Margo Martindale) has taken care of Loretta (Kaitlyn Dever) and hides her father's death from her. Raylan and Tim (Jacob Pitts) are assigned to transport a pregnant inmate, Jamie Berglund (Sarah Jones), from her prison to the hospital. However, Raylan and Tim are cornered by Jess Timmons (David Sullivan) and Van (James Jordan), and they take Jamie from them. Jess and Van, both working in human trafficking, plan to perform a C-section on Jamie, who unsuccessfully tries to escape.

Raylan and Tim locate Jamie's husband and even the husband was unaware of her pregnancy. They begin suspecting that a prison guard may be the father. They question prison guard Glenn Cosgrove (Kai Lennox), having obtained evidence that he hired Jess and Van to kill Jamie and stop the affair from being revealed. They drive to the house where Jamie is being held and where Jess has killed Van after a disagreement in the operation. They find Jess holding Jamie behind a couch and although Jess states that he is in a safe position, Tim manages to kill him from a distance.

Boyd visits Ava (Joelle Carter) after facing an injury at his job and Ava tends his wounds. At his office, Raylan is visited by Glenn's wife, Gayle (Christie Lynn Smith), who was wondering if it would be possible to adopt Jamie's baby as Gayle is unable to conceive. Raylan tells her he will look at it. He returns to his hotel room, only to be visited by Gary (William Ragsdale). Gary explains to Raylan that he intends to win back Winona (Natalie Zea) after the whole Duffy incident and leaves. Raylan enters the room with a sleeping Winona, not telling her about his encounter with Gary outside. Raylan does not want to share the details of what happened in his day but Winona tells him she wants to know everything. He starts by saying he talked to her husband outside.

Reception

Viewers
In its original American broadcast, "The Life Inside" was seen by an estimated 2.41 million household viewers and gained a 0.9/3 ratings share among adults aged 18–49, according to Nielsen Media Research. This means that 0.9 percent of all households with televisions watched the episode, while 3 percent of all households watching television at that time watched it. This was a 31% decrease in viewership from the previous episode, which was watched by 3.47 million viewers with a 1.3/4 in the 18-49 demographics.

Critical reviews
"The Life Inside" received positive reviews from critics. Scott Tobias of The A.V. Club gave the episode a "B+" grade and wrote,"'The Life Inside' finds the show settling into the season, too, but it strikes me as an improvement on all fronts, supporting a satisfying and thematically compelling self-contained A-plot with a lot of intrigue at the margins."

Alan Sepinwall of HitFix wrote, "All in all, a solid follow-up to last week's terrific premiere. Any episode that puts Tim Olyphant in scenes with both Walton Goggins and Raymond Barry is almost automatically good, and this one had plenty beyond that."

Dan Forcella of TV Fanatic gave the episode a 3.5 star rating out of 5 and wrote, "I thought Justified improved greatly throughout its first season, and showed much promise of in last week's premiere, finding the right mixture of episodic storyline and long-term serialization. 'The Life Inside,' however, returned a bit too much to the procedural format I hoped the show had moved on from a while ago."

References

External links
 

Justified (TV series) episodes
2011 American television episodes